Love and Understanding is an album by saxophonist Jimmy Heath featuring performances recorded in 1973 and originally released on the Muse label.

Reception

Scott Yanow of Allmusic says, "This is one of Jimmy Heath's more unusual and versatile records".

Track listing
All compositions by Jimmy Heath except as indicated
 "One for Juan" - 7:03   
 "In a Sentimental Mood" (Duke Ellington, Manny Kurtz, Irving Mills) - 5:07   
 "Head up! Feet Down!"  - 7:11   
 "Far Away Lands" - 5:03   
 "Smilin' Billy" - 5:48   
 "Gemini" - 7:51

Personnel
Jimmy Heath - tenor saxophone, soprano saxophone, flute
Curtis Fuller - trombone 
Bernard Fennell - cello
Stanley Cowell - piano, electric piano
Bob Cranshaw  - electric bass
Billy Higgins - drums, tambourine

References

Muse Records albums
Jimmy Heath albums
1973 albums
Albums produced by Don Schlitten